Paracarphalea is a genus of flowering plants belonging to the family Rubiaceae.

Its native range is Madagascar.

Species:

Paracarphalea angulata 
Paracarphalea kirondron 
Paracarphalea pervilleana

References

Rubiaceae
Rubiaceae genera
Taxa named by Birgitta Bremer